Mike Stone (born April 29, 1955) is an American college baseball coach, and last served as the head coach of the UMass Minutemen baseball team.  He was named to that position prior to the 1988 season. Stone retired after the 2017 season.

Playing career
Stone played high school baseball at Taft School, and was drafted in the third round of the 1974 MLB Draft by the St. Louis Cardinals.  He played four seasons in the Cardinals organization, primarily as a catcher, and reached Class-AA, and spent one season in the Los Angeles Dodgers organization.

After ending his baseball career, Stone played football for UMass while pursuing a degree in physical education.

Coaching career
Stone began coaching at Northfield Mount Hermon School, serving as head baseball coach for the 1982 season.  He then earned a position as head coach at Vermont, where he remained for five seasons, succeeding Jack Leggett.  In his time at Vermont, the Catamounts struggled but finished above .500 in his final season.  Stone also earned a master's degree while at Vermont.

During his tenure at UMass, the Minutemen have won eight Atlantic 10 Conference regular season crowns, a pair of Atlantic 10 Conference baseball tournament titles, and seen 36 players sign professional contracts.  Stone was named Atlantic 10 Conference Coach of the Year three times in a row from 1994 through 1996.

Head coaching record
This table shows Stone's record as a college head coach.

See also

References

Living people
1955 births
Arkansas Travelers players
Clinton Dodgers players
Gulf Coast Cardinals players
High school baseball coaches in the United States
High school ice hockey coaches in the United States
Lodi Dodgers players
St. Petersburg Cardinals players
Taft School alumni
UMass Minutemen baseball coaches
UMass Minutemen football players
Vermont Catamounts baseball coaches
University of Vermont alumni